The 2006–07 UMass Minutemen basketball team represented the University of Massachusetts Amherst during the 2006–07 NCAA Division I men's basketball season. The Minutemen, led by second year head coach Travis Ford, played their home games at William D. Mullins Memorial Center and are members of the Atlantic 10 Conference. They finished the season 24-9, 13-3 in A-10 play to finish for a first place tie with Xavier.

Roster

Schedule

|-
!colspan=9| Exhibition

|-
!colspan=9| Regular Season

|-
!colspan=9| 2007 Atlantic 10 men's basketball tournament

|-
!colspan=9| 2007 NIT

References

UMass Minutemen basketball seasons
Umass
Umass